The 2002 Philippine Team-Hapee Toothpaste is one of the two teams which sponsored a national pool that played in the 2002 PBA Governors' Cup as part of the league's continued support to the Philippine men's national basketball team that will compete in the 2002 Asian Games in Busan, South Korea. A total of 30 players were picked and divided into two groups.   

National team coach Jong Uichico serves as the monitoring body on the overall progress of the two training squads. The Hapee team were composed of 14 PBA players and one player, Rommel Adducul, from the MBA.

Roster

References

2002 PBA season by team
Philippines men's national basketball team